Taleqan (also Romanized as Ṭâleqân) is a city in and the capital of Taleqan County, Alborz province, Iran. It is located in the Alborz mountain range. At the 2006 census, its population was 3,281 in 988 households. At the time of the latest census in 2016, its population had increased to 3,545 in 1,241 households.

References 

Taleqan County

Rural Districts of Alborz Province

Populated places in Alborz Province

Populated places in Taleqan County

Settled areas of Elburz